Air Vice-Marshal Paul Alexander Godfrey,  is a senior Royal Air Force officer, who serves as the first commander of the United Kingdom Space Command.

Early life and education
Godfrey grew up in RAF Kenley, south of London. He was educated at Trinity School of John Whitgift, then an all-boys private school in the London Borough of Croydon. While at school, he was a member of the Combined Cadet Force, and gained his private pilot licence at 17.

Military career
Godfrey was commissioned into the Royal Air Force on 9 May 1991. After serving as a Harrier jump jet pilot, he became station commander at RAF Lossiemouth in November 2015. In February 2021 it was announced that he would become the first Commander, United Kingdom Space Command. In taking up the post he will be promoted to the rank of Air Vice-Marshal.

Godfrey was appointed Officer of the Order of the British Empire (OBE) in the 2014 Birthday Honours.

References

External links 
 AvGeeks profile

Living people
Officers of the Order of the British Empire
Royal Air Force air marshals
Space force commanders
Year of birth missing (living people)
People educated at Trinity School of John Whitgift